Procambarus franzi, the Orange Lake cave crayfish, is a species of crayfish in the family Cambaridae. It is endemic to two caves in Marion County, Florida,

References

Cambaridae
Endemic fauna of Florida
Freshwater crustaceans of North America
Cave crayfish
Taxonomy articles created by Polbot
Crustaceans described in 1976
Taxa named by Horton H. Hobbs Jr.